The canton of Châteauneuf-de-Randon is a former canton of France, located in the Lozère department, in the Languedoc-Roussillon region. It had 1,694 inhabitants (2012). It was disbanded following the French canton reorganisation which came into effect in March 2015. It consisted of 8 communes, which joined the canton of Grandrieu in 2015.

Communes 
The canton of Châteauneuf-de-Randon covered 8 communes:
 Châteauneuf-de-Randon (chief town)
 Chaudeyrac
 Arzenc-de-Randon
 Pierrefiche
 Saint-Jean-la-Fouillouse
 Montbel
 Laubert
 Saint-Sauveur-de-Ginestoux

Population

References 

Former cantons of Lozère
2015 disestablishments in France
States and territories disestablished in 2015